Yeysk is a port and a resort town in Krasnodar Krai, Russia, situated on the shore of the Taganrog Gulf of the Sea of Azov. The town is built primarily on the Yeysk Spit, which separates the Yeya River from the Sea of Azov. Population:

History
In the 14th century, in this area was a Genoese colony with a port called Balzimachi (or Bacinaci), which is mentioned in Pratica della mercatura.

Tsutsiev's Atlas shows a Yeyskoye at the head of the Yeya bay for 1763-1785 and a Yeysk somewhat south of the present location from 1829-1839. In 1783 it was involved in the Kuban Nogai Uprising. The town was founded in 1848 by Prince Mikhail Semyonovich Vorontsov in accordance with a royal order from the Tsar of Russia.

Administrative and municipal status
Within the framework of administrative divisions, Yeysk serves as the administrative center of Yeysky District, even though it is not a part of it. As an administrative division, it is, together with the territory of Shirochansky Rural Okrug (which comprises seven rural localities), incorporated separately as the Town of Yeysk—an administrative unit with the status equal to that of the districts. As a municipal division, the Town of Yeysk is incorporated within Yeysky Municipal District as Yeyskoye Urban Settlement.

Yeysk resorts
Yeysk is known for its mineral waters and its medicinal mud baths. This mud is brought from the neighboring Lake Khanskoye. The town has a number of parks, a sanatorium, several recreation centers, hotels, and beaches. The bathing season lasts from May until September. Yeysk offers a variety of attractions, restaurants, open-air cafes, clubs, bars, and night clubs.

The most popular resort area in Yeysk is Dolgaya Spit, near the village of Dolzhanskaya.

Airfield

Yeysk has a mixed military/civilian airfield, home to the Yeysk Military Institute during the Cold War and the 10th Mixed Aviation Division (4th Air Army) during the 1990s.

After the disbandment of the 10th Mixed Aviation Division the headquarters of the 1st Guards Stalingrad, Svirsky Composite Air Division arrived. Also at the airport based aviation group Yeisk Higher Military Institute, armed with planes L-39.

In addition, the 959th Bomber Regiment was previously based at the airfield, which was part of the 1st Guards Composite Air Division. The 959th Bomber Aviation Regiment was previously the 959th Training Aviation Regiment. In September 2009, due to the transfer of the airfield from the Air Force to the Navy, the regiment was disbanded, and its members were part of the aircraft Su-24 relocated to Morozovsk airfield (6970th Air Base, 7th Brigade of Aerospace Defence).

On February 1, 2010, 859th Naval Aviation Training Center under the leadership of Major-General Alexei Serdyuk was open at the airfield. To ensure the educational process training units will be relocated from the Ostrov (air base) (Pskov Oblast) and the village of Kacha. For service center from the previously disbanded and civilian staff will be involved in more than one thousand people.

On 17 October 2022, a Sukhoi Su-34 from the airfield struck an apartment building in Yeysk, killing at least 15.

Climate
Yeysk has a mild climate. Average rainfall is about  a year.

International relations

Twin towns — Sister cities
Yeysk is twinned with:
 Baranovichi, Belarus
 Barysaw, Belarus

References

Notes

Sources

External links
Official website of Yeysk 
Pictures of Yeysk
Old maps of Yeysk 

Cities and towns in Krasnodar Krai
1848 establishments in the Russian Empire
Populated places established in 1848
Port cities and towns in Russia
Port cities and towns of the Azov Sea
Seaside resorts in Russia
Spa towns in Russia